This is a list of launches made by the Long March rocket family between 1970 and 1979.

Launch statistics

Rocket configurations

Launch outcomes

Launch history

1970–1974

|}

1975–1979

|}

Sources 

 
 
 
 

Space program of the People's Republic of China
Long March